Seguin is a township in central Ontario, Canada, in the District of Parry Sound.

History
The Township of Seguin was created by Minister's Order, dated May 8, 1997. Pursuant to this Order, the Township of Seguin became a newly incorporated municipality, effective January 1, 1998.

The Township of Seguin is the amalgamated municipality of the former Townships of Christie, Foley and Humphrey, and the Village of Rosseau as well as an annexation of the western portion of the unorganized Township of Monteith.

The township
The Township of Seguin is the most southerly municipality in the District of Parry Sound. It is also the first municipality in Northern Ontario in the Highways 69 and 400 corridor.

The township includes the communities of Black Road, Brignall, Dockmure, Dock Siding, Falding, Gordon Bay, Haines Lake, Hamer Bay, Hayes Corners, Holmur, Horseshoe Lake, Humphrey, Lake Joseph, Orrville, Otter Lake, Port Cockburn, Rose Point, Rosseau, Rosseau Road, Seguin Falls, South Parry, Stanley House, Swords and Turtle Lake.  The administrative offices of the township are located in Humphrey.

Demographics 

See also
 Camp Ekon
List of townships in Ontario

References

External links

Municipalities in Parry Sound District
Single-tier municipalities in Ontario
Township municipalities in Ontario